Collinder 135, known sometimes as the Pi Puppis Cluster, is an open cluster in Puppis constellation.

It consists of six stars brighter than 6th magnitude, and a widespread population of fainter stars. It lies in the southern celestial hemisphere near a rich star field. The main component is the star Pi Puppis, which gives to the cluster its common name; it is an orange supergiant with a visual magnitude of 2.71. Two of the 5th magnitude stars are all variables: NV Puppis is a Gamma Cassiopeiae variable, while NW Puppis is a Beta Cephei variable.

References

External links

Observing Cr 135

Open clusters
Puppis